The history of Dedham, Massachusetts in the 20th century saw great growth come to the town. It played host to the Sacco and Vanzetti trial, saw the Endicott Estate and a number of schools constructed, a great deal of economic development, and growth in the number of services provided by the Town.

Government
A bill establishing a representative Town Meeting was established in 1928, and then amended in 1948.  It was almost amended again when a resident used a friendly representative in a neighboring community to introduce and pass a bill in the General Court.  A Charter was adopted later in the century, and amended again in the 21st century.

The Department of Public Works was created in 1933. The Recreation Department was begun in the 1930s with an effort to build and staff three playgrounds around town. By the 1960s there were 10 playgrounds. The first Recreation Commission was elected in 1941.

Fire Department
The first fire chief was appointed in 1920. Prior to that there was a four-member Board of Fire Engineers who had charge over fires. Hurricane Carol knocked down the East Dedham firehouse's 80 foot bell tower on August 31, 1954.  It flew across the station and landed on 219 Bussey St, the house next door, where Louise Guerrio was feeding her one-year-old son, Joseph.  It also crushed three cars parked on Bussey St.

A firehouse was constructed on Westfield Street, near High Street, in 1906. The lower level had horse stalls, a stable room, a hose wago, and engine room, and an opening to the paddock in the rear. The second story had a sleeping room, a company room, a lavatory, a bath, and a hay and grain room. The building housed horse drawn steamer engines. It went out of service sometime in the 20th century, but still exists as a private residence.

Firefighters began wearing uniforms in 1906.

Fires
Shortly after 2 a.m. on October 19, 1940, a fire at the Log Cafe on Bridge Street was called in.  The fire destroyed the Cafe and Breed's boathouse.  Chief Henry J. Harrigan entered one of the buildings to inspect the progress of the fire when the floor beneath him gave way, causing him to fall 15 feet, stunning him and causing him to become overcome by smoke and heat  Fireman Joseph C. Nagle, "despite the blinding smoke and flames, rushed into the building and carried Chief Harrigan outside," suffering burns and smoke inhalation in the process.

Nagle was brought to the Dedham Emergency Hospital, and a firefighter worked on Harrigan with a pulmanator before he was taken to the Faulkner Hospital by several police officers in an ambulance.  Harrigan, a 47-year veteran of the force, died slightly after 4 a.m., leaving behind a wife and four daughters.  A plaque was unveiled in his honor outside the main firehouse on the 75th anniversary of his death, and both Harrigan and Nagle were posthumously awarded the Medal of Honor.  Harrigan's funeral at St. Mary's Church was attended by 1,500 people, including chiefs from 100 cities and towns.

In 1994, a difficult fire broke out on Rockland Street. A woman was trapped inside, and was rescued by members of Engine Company 3. The Henry J. Harrigan Medal of Honor was established to honor the members of the engine company for their bravery.

Police Department
After the department purchased its first police motorcycle in 1923, Abe Rafferty was appointed the first motorcycle officer. By 1936, there were 18 officers.

In December 1973, the Dedham Police Department investigated the sighting of several unidentified flying objects over town. A young couple on a date had their car followed by UFO while they drove through Dedham.

Headquarters
The department was located on the first floor of Memorial Hall until Town Clerk John Carey locked the doors for the last time on March 16, 1962. The building was demolished in April 1962 after a new town hall was built on Bryant St. The police took up temporary residence in the new town hall for a year while a new police station was built on the Memorial Hall property.

On April 29, 1963, the Police Department moved into their new headquarters on the corner of High and Washington Streets. It included a fallout shelter in the cellar that featured walls of 6-inch reinforced concrete and a lead window cover that could be put in place to shield occupants from fallout resulting from a nuclear explosion. It also housed the Civil Defense Communication Center.

Schools

Quincy School

In April 1909, Town Meeting voted to appropriate $60,000 to build a new Quincy School and $6,000 for furnishings, fittings, and grading. The original school, it was said at the time was "only held together by the last coat of paint [and had] clearly outlived its usefulness."

The new school was completed on budget and built at the intersection of Greenhood, Quincy, and Bussey Streets. It was dedicated on June 4, 1910. Within the two-story building were ten rooms. It measured 79' by 140' and was made of brick with sandstone trimming. The interior was outfitted with hard pine.

The new school was used until 1982 when declining enrollment and Proposition 2½ forced its closure. Town Meeting authorized the sale of the property to a developer in 1982, but only after off-duty police officers and firefighters were able to find and bring enough Town Representatives to reach a quorum.

Dedham High School
Dedham High School began playing Norwood High School in an annual football contest in 1920. Over the years, there have been several notable incidents. In 1946, thousands of fans swarmed the field for about 20 minutes after a Norwood touchdown pass was brought back on an offensive interfernce penalty. During the closing minutes of the game, the crowd threw stones and other objects at the officials. The Dedham Police Department had to escort them off the field after the game. 

In 1956, seven boys from Norwood High School threw bottles of blue and white paint, the school colors, through the windows of Dedham's School Department administration building to celebrate their team's win the day before. While they admitted to the paint, they denied being involved with the smashing of 22 windows at Dedham High School on Thanksgiving Day.

20th century representation in the General Court
Dedham was represented by a number of women and men in the Great and General Court of Massachusetts.

Sacco and Vanzetti
The historic Sacco and Vanzetti trial was held in the Dedham Courthouse in 1921 under heavy police guard.  The two were Italian-born American anarchists, who were arrested, tried, and executed for the killings of Frederick Parmenter, a shoe factory paymaster, and Alessandro Berardelli, a security guard, and for the robbery of $15,766.51 from the factory's payroll on April 15, 1920.  Many believe that they "were the innocent victims of political and economic interests determined to  send a message about the rising tide of anarchist violence."

The trial opened on May 31, 1921 with heavy security. Police were stationed at every entrance of the courthouse and all those entering were searched for weapons. The State Constabulary patrolled outside on horseback and motorcycles and the courtroom was retrofitted with bomb shutters and sliding steel doors that could seal off that wing of the courthouse in case of an attack. The cast iron shutters on the windows were designed and painted to match the wooden ones on the rest of the building. The courtroom was so protected that "the trial would be conducted in a far more formidable cage than the simple prisoner's cage that surrounded Sacco and Vanzetti during their trial."

During the trial, Supreme Court Justice Brandeis, who was then in Washington, invited Sacco's wife to stay at his home near the courthouse.  He was not the only member of the nation's highest court to be involved with the case. Felix Frankfurter, then a law professor at Harvard, "did more than any individual to rally "respectable" opinion behind the two men, saw the case as a test of the rule of law itself."  Several years later, in May 1926, Frankfurter would travel to the Dedham courthouse to make a motion for a new trial after another man, also in the Dedham Jail, confessed to the crime.

The motion was denied by Judge Webster Thayer in October and in the next 10 months the Supreme Judicial Court, a federal judge and three Supreme Court Justices, including Brandeis, each denied motions for either a new trial or a stay of execution. On August 23, 1927 the two were electrocuted in the Charlestown jail. The "executions sent hundreds of thousands of protesters into the streets of six continents."  The American embassy in Paris was surrounded by tanks to fend off rioting mobs and demonstrations in Germany ended with six deaths. In Geneva "over 5,000 protesters destroyed all things American: cars, goods, even theaters showing American films."  Frankfurter would write a scathing critique of the case entitled "The Case of Sacco-Vanzetti: a critical analysis for lawyers and laymen."   It would first be published in The Atlantic Monthly and then as a hardcover book.

Endicott Estate

In 1904, the home of Henry Bradford Endicott, the founder of the multimillion-dollar  Endicott-Johnson Shoe Company had his home on East Street burn to the ground. The fire department was not able to get to the estate in time as they were dealing with three other fires simultaneously, including one at the fire house.  Henry cleared the ashes away and built a new homestead on the  parcel.  The three story building he constructed has nine bathrooms, eight bedrooms, a library, a music room, a ballroom, a mirrored parlor, a butler's kitchen, a linen room, and servants' quarters.

When he died in 1920 he left the building to his stepdaughter Katherine. She died in 1967 without any children and willed the land and the estate to the town for "education, civic, social and recreational purposes".  At the time "town didn't know quite what to do with it" and "Town Meeting voted to offer it to the Commonwealth."  Governor John Volpe took the title to the 25 room estate in a ceremony on December 7, 1967 and intended to use it as a governor's mansion. It soon became apparent that it would be cheaper to build a brand new mansion than to remodel the estate to Volpe's wife's "lavish taste" and "crazy notions" than to renovate the Endicott Estate and in 1969 the Commonwealth gave the estate back to the Town.  In 1921 Endicott's widow gave $35,000 to the American Legion to build a clubhouse nearby the estate on Whiting Ave.

Private Schools
In 1922, the Noble and Greenough School moved from Boston to Dedham. They purchased the Nickerson Castle and turned the estate into a  campus in Riverdale along the Charles River.  In 1957 Ursuline Academy moved from Boston's Back Bay to a  parcel in Upper Dedham.  The Ursuline nuns who ran the school purchased the property which included a grand manor house designed by Boston architect Guy Lowell. The house, described as "one of the grandest of grand mansions west of Boston, and comparable to what one would see in Newport," was built by Francis Skinner for his new wife Sarah Carr, in 1906.  Today, the mansion once known as the Federal Hill Farm has "the richest and most elaborate residential rooms in Dedham" and serves as a convent for the sisters who run the school.

Churches
In 1907, the Methodist congregation built a new church in Oakdale Square at the corner of Oakdale Avenue and Fairview Streets. St. Luke's Lutheran Church expanded their chapel in West Roxbury in 1917 before building a new church at 950 East Street, on the site of the former Endicott School, in 1960.

The 1852 Baptist church in East Dedham added a bell tower to the church in 1911. A new church was built on the same site in 1972. In 1994, Roslindale's Grace Baptist Church merged with the Dedham church, and the new congregation became known as Fellowship Bible Church.

The Riverdale Congregational Church grew out of a Sunday School class held in William Lent's boathouse. Mr. and Mrs. Henry Bingham donated money and land to build the church, which was completed in 1914 and expanded in the 1960s. When the church closed, the church donated their remaining funds in 1992 to be used as a scholarship for a member of the graduating class of Dedham High School who attended the Riverdale School. , the building was used by the Calvary Baptist Church.

The Christian Science congregation first held services in the Odd Fellows Hall in 1920 and in 1930 moved to the Masonic Hall. In 1932, they bought Nathaniel Ames' house, moved it to the back of the lot, and built a new church. The cornerstone for the church was laid in December 1938 and a steeple was added after 1940. The first service was held on March 3, 1940.

By the 1930s, St. Mary's was one of the largest parishes in the Archdiocese with over 6,000 parishioners and 1,300 students in Sunday School.  During the middle of that decade there were four priests and six nuns ministering to the congregation.  In the 1950s, it became clear that a second parish was needed in Dedham, and so St. Susanna's Church was established in 1960 to serve the needs of the Riverdale neighborhood.  When St. Susanna's opened it had 300 families, while 2,500 stayed at St. Mary's.  Before the first mass was said in the new church on February 11, 1962, services were held at Moseley's on the Charles.

Economy

Dedham Square
In 1900, the Greenleaf Building was finished on the corner of High and Washington Streets, opposite Memorial Hall. It was designed and built by Luther C. Greenleaf and his architectural firm of Greenleaf and Cobb. The building was home to the waiting rooms and offices for the trolley company, stores, a banquet room, offices, and an apartment for the janitor. It was razed in the 1940s.

On March 1, 1967, Ma Riva's Sub Shop opened in Dedham, where Emily and Addie's was in 2018.  It eventually would become D'Angelos and then bought out by Papa Gino's.  Both are still headquartered on the old Route 1 in Dedham.

Oakdale
In 1903, there were nine blacksmith shops in Dedham. The last one listed in the town directory, Frank P. Kern of Williams Street, appeared in 1941.

A six storefront building was built in Oakdale Square at the corner of Oakdale Avenue and Sanderson Avenue in 1925. Neighbors complained, however, that it would create a "blind corner" for motoroists, and the building inspector tried to shut the construction down. The builder, John Picone of Newton, sued the Town to resume construction. The case made it to the Massachusetts Supreme Judicial Court where Associate Justice Henry K. Braley ruled in favor of Picone. The main store in the building would go on to house Danny's Supermarket, Stop & Shop, Tedeschis, and 7-11. 7-11 shut down in the fall of 2022. 

The Rust Craft Greeting Card Company moved to Dedham in 1954 from Kansas City. In 1958, they built what was at the time the largest greeting card factory in the world on what is today Rustcraft Road. They were the first company to sell greeting cards with a fitted envelope and introduced cards for Easter, Valentine's Day, St. Patrick's Day, anniversaries, and more. The building has been used for a variety of other purposes since 1980.

East Dedham
By the early part of the 20th century, East Dedham had become developed as a busy mill village. The neighborhood had schools, churches, and homes, in addition to the commercial district known today as East Dedham Square centered at the intersection of High and Bussey Streets. The textile mills along Mother Brook began closing in the 1910s and 1920s, however, as owenrs sought cheaper labor and more favorable conditions in the south.

East Dedham urban renewal project
In 1965, Town Meeting voted to declare East Dedham Square "blighted" and undertake an urban renewal project. The measured passed by a single vote more than was needed to reach the two-thirds majority required. The project was scaled back from 26 to 14 acres, but nine residential properties were taken, forcing the relocation of 42 families.

Much of East Dedham Square was raised. In the 1920s, the neighborhood was home to a haberdashery, an undertaker, stables, a grocery story, a bakery, a pharmacy, a dentist, and more. After the project, a strip mall, public housing, a parking lot, and condo development took their place.

Other

1900s
In 1900, a talented young lawyer from Boston bought a home with his new wife at 194 Village Avenue. Sixteen years later Louis D. Brandeis rode the train home from his office and his wife greeted him as "Mr. Justice."   While he was at work that day his appointment to the United States Supreme Court had been confirmed that day by the United States Senate. Brandeis was a member of the Dedham Country and Polo Club and the Dedham Historical Society as well as a member of the Society in Dedham for Apprehending Horse Thieves.  He wrote to his brother of the town saying: "Dedham is a spring of eternal youth for me. I feel newly made and ready to deny the existence of these grey hairs."

Around 1900, Dr. Harry K. Shatswell of School Street built and drove a "steam powered horseless carriage" through the streets of town.  This was two years after the first automobile went on sale in the United States. That same year, Theodore Burgess purchased three French automobiles for himself and his wife, who is thought to be the first woman to drive in Massachusetts.  In 1903, there were 11 cars registered in Dedham.

During World War I, 642 men from Dedham served, and 18 died.  The first to enlist was Henry W. Farnsworth who fought with the French Foreign Legion and was killed in action at Tahure, France, in October 1915.  Of the 60 soldiers who voluntarily were inoculated with the germs that caused trench fever, two, Joseph Fiola and Norman G. Barrett, were from Dedham.  A memorial was erected to those who served in the war at the corner of East Street and Whiting Ave.

1920s
In 1920 a man's skeleton was found hanging from a tree in the woods near Wigwam Pond.  Another was unearthed on the eastern shore of the Pond in 1923 when workers were digging a foundation for a house.

In 1921, the local American Legion post moved into the home at the corner of East Street and Whiting Avenue originally built by  Charles and Mary Shaw. They purchased the house with a $35,000 donation from Henry B. Endicott.

1930s

During the 1936 tercentenary celebrations, Olympians Ellison "Tarzan" Brown and Johnny Kelley ran in a "mug hunt."  The roughly 9.5 mile race was the third annual, and was sponsored by the Oakdale Athletic Club and organized by Harold Rosen.  The start was in Oakdale Square and the finish was at Stone Park.

1950s

In 1956, the American Legion moved from the Shaw House to 155 Eastern Avenue. The Dedham Public Schools then used the house as their administrative offices.

In 1957, Joseph Demling, a resident of Macomber Terrace, walked into Town Hall with the carcass of the 35 pound bobcat. He asked for a $20 bounty on the animal, citing a by-law passed by the Town Meeting in 1734. The Town originally balked, suggesting that the animal came from Needham, but eventually paid Demling the money he requested.

The first transatlantic direct dial telephone call was made by Sally Reed in Dedham, Massachusetts to her penpal, Ann Morsley, in Dedham, Essex, in 1957.  It was witnessed by Reed's teacher, Grace Hine, Dedham's former chief telephone operator, Margaret Dooley, and several representatives of New England Telephone and Telegraph Company.

1960s
The 1960s brought a number of events to Dedham that, like the building of the Fairbanks House, may not have seemed important at the time but have proved to be major events. After an executive order signed by President John F. Kennedy in 1961 allowed federal employees to unionize, the Federal Employees Veterans Association met in an emergency convention in Dedham. They voted to reorganize themselves into the National Association of Government Employees, today a large and powerful public union.

David Stanley Jacubanis robbed a bank in Dedham the following year, after he was paroled in Vermont. He was, for a time, on the Federal Bureau of Investigation's 10 Most Wanted List. In 1967, the Flag Day Parade began and quickly became one of Dedham's most beloved traditions.

On August 18, 1964, a 17-year-old Dedhamite was driving in the rain and missed a left hand turn from Whiting Avenue onto East Street. His car smashed into the east wing of the Fairbanks House with the rear bumper flush with the wall. The 1957 sedan remained in the house overnight until it could be removed the next day. The accident prompted a stone wall to be erected which prevented another car from hitting the house in 1973.

Population
The population of Dedham has grown more than 10 times since 1793, reaching its peak around the year 1980.

New towns and subdivisions

With the division and subdivision of so many communities, Dedham has been called the "Mother of Towns."

New neighborhoods
By 1910 the area on the opposite side of the Charles River began to be developed.  It was once known as Dedham Island or Cow Island, as the Long Ditch connected the river in two spots and bypassed the 'great bend.'  Today, the neighborhood is known as Riverdale. 

After his father's death in 1898, Ebenezer Talbot Paul inherited a vast tract of land that stretched from what is today known as Oakdale, Greenlodge, Endicott, and the Manor, as well as the family home at 390 Cedar St. In the 1920s, he began subdividing the land into house lots and named the streets after members of his family. Paul Street was named for him, while Taylor Ave was named for his wife, Mariette Taylor. Dresser Ave was named for his mother, Susan Dresser, and Crane Street for his grandmother, Martha Crane. He proposed calling the new neighborhood Ashcroft Woods.

Some of the proposed streets were never built, and a proposed intersection of Beech Street with Turner Street never materialiezed, likely due to a large rock in what was once known as Ogden's Woods. It was proposed that the name Mt. Vernon Street be continued on the other side of the Boston and Providence Railroad, but it was named Kimball Road instead. Paul died in 1930, but most of the homes were not built until the 1950s. 

In 1951, the Town of Dedham purchased a three acre plot from the Paul estate for $2,625 and built Paul Park on it. Several hundred people attended the dedication ceremony on June 8, 1952.

The Sprague farm by the Neponset River became known as the Manor and, in the last major development of town, the Smith Farm became the neighborhood of Greenlodge.

Notes

References

Works cited

20th century in Massachusetts